Davis Pereira (born 21 January 1958) is a Brazilian former cyclist. He competed in the individual road race event at the 1980 Summer Olympics.

References

External links
 

1958 births
Living people
Brazilian male cyclists
Brazilian road racing cyclists
Olympic cyclists of Brazil
Cyclists at the 1980 Summer Olympics
Place of birth missing (living people)